Najafqulu Khan II was the Second khan of the Tabriz Khanate from 1784 to 1786.

References

People from Tabriz
People from Khoy
Tabriz Khanate
Donboli tribe